The women's freestyle 72 kilograms is a competition featured at the 2013 World Wrestling Championships, and was held at the László Papp Budapest Sports Arena in Budapest, Hungary on 20 September 2013.

This freestyle wrestling competition consisted of a single-elimination tournament, with a repechage used to determine the winners of two bronze medals.

Results
Legend
F — Won by fall
WO — Won by walkover

Final

Top half

Bottom half

Repechage

References
Results Book, Page 92

Women's freestyle 72 kg
World